Klaudia Kinská (born 15 June 1978) is a Slovak gymnast. She competed in five events at the 1996 Summer Olympics.

References

1978 births
Living people
Slovak female artistic gymnasts
Olympic gymnasts of Slovakia
Gymnasts at the 1996 Summer Olympics
Sportspeople from Košice